Waitemata City was a New Zealand city in the greater Auckland area. It was formed in 1974 from the western part of the old Waitemata County, with both the County and City taking their names from Waitemata Harbour. In 1989, when New Zealand local government bodies underwent a major re-organisation, Waitemata City joined with its southern neighbours, the boroughs of Henderson, Glen Eden, and New Lynn, to form the modern city of Waitakere.

History 

Waitemata City formed on 1 August 1974 from the Titirangi, Te Atatū, Lincoln and Waitākere ridings. The city was composed of most of modern West Auckland, except for the boroughs of New Lynn, Glen Eden and Henderson. Henderson borough refused to amalgamate into the city, preferring to retain its unique identity, while the New Lynn and Glen Eden borough councils were interested, but were unable to meet the deadline to merge.

The Waitemata City Council offices opened in 1983, at the modern location of ACG Sunderland. This was the first time that the Waitemata City or Waitemata Borough local government offices had been located in its own territory; variously located in central Auckland or Henderson Borough in the past.

With the 1989 local government reforms, the Waitemata City merged with the New Lynn, Glen Eden and Henderson boroughs to form the Waitakere City.

List of mayors 

Mayors of Waitemata City were:

References

Bibliography

History of Auckland=
Politics of the Auckland Region
1874 establishments in New Zealand
1989 disestablishments in New Zealand
Former subdivisions of the Auckland Region
West Auckland, New Zealand